Robert Forbes (1708–1775) was a Scottish Non-juring Anglican bishop. He served as the bishop of Ross and Caithness for the Scottish Episcopal Church.

Life
Forbes was born in 1708 at Rayne in Aberdeenshire, where his father was schoolmaster. He was educated at Marischal College, Aberdeen (A.M. 1726). In 1735 he went to Edinburgh, was ordained priest by Bishop David Freebairn, and was shortly appointed minister of the episcopal congregation at Leith, a town which was his home for the rest of his life. In his room there, in 1740, John Skinner received baptism at his hands.

On 7 September 1745, when Charles Edward Stuart was on his descent from the Highlands, Forbes was one of three episcopal clergymen who were arrested at St. Ninians, near Stirling, suspected of intending to join the rebels, confined in Stirling Castle till 4 February 1746, and in Edinburgh Castle until 29 May.

In 1762 the episcopal clergy of Ross and Caithness elected him their bishop, and he was consecrated at Forfar on 24 June by the Primus of the Scottish Episcopal Church, William Falconer, with Bishops Andrew Gerard and Alexander. He continued to live at Leith, but made two visitations of his northern flock in 1762 and 1770. In 1764 he had a new church built for him, where he gathered a good congregation; but he would not ‘qualify’ according to law, and he was soon reported to government. Soldiers were sent to his meeting to see whether he prayed for King George III, and he was summoned before the colonel-commanding (Dalrymple). An account of the interview that ensued is preserved in his third ‘Journal.’ He made no submission, but thought it better to have his services without singing; and, receiving advice from a friend, he went for some weeks to London. There he worshipped with the remnant of the nonjurors, and received from their bishop Robert Gordon a staff that had once belonged to George Hickes. In 1769 he was at a meeting of Jacobites at Moffat, when proposals were discussed for the continuance of the Stuart line and the Stuart pretensions by marrying Charles Edward to a Protestant.

On the death of Gerard, Forbes was elected bishop of Aberdeen and Orkney in 1765, but difficulties arose and he declined the appointment.

Forbes died at Leith 18 November 1775, and was buried in the Maltman's aisle of South Leith parish church.

Works
Forbes began about 1760 to write in the Edinburgh Magazine, his articles being chiefly topographical and antiquarian. He took part in updating the communion office of the Scottish Episcopal Church, the editions of 1763, 1764, and 1765 being printed under his supervision. The Journals of his episcopal visitations were edited in 1886 by James Brown Craven.

In the bishop's own lifetime appeared An Essay on Christian Burial, and the Respect due to Burying-Grounds, by a ‘Ruling Elder of the Church of Scotland’ (1765), and an Account of the Chapel of Roslin (1774).

His major work is the ‘Lyon in Mourning,’ ten octavo volumes in manuscript, bound in black, and filled with collections relative to the Jacobite Rising of 1745 with which are bound up a number of relics of the same expedition. Among those interviewed in detail for the project was the Scottish Gaelic poet and Jacobite propagandist Alasdair MacMhaighstir Alasdair.

The volumes date from 1747 to 1775; extracts from them were published (1834) under the title of Jacobite Memoirs, by Robert Chambers, from the originals in the Advocates' Library, Edinburgh. An edition appeared in 1895: The Lyon in Mourning, edited by Henry Paton, Scottish History Society, Edinburgh.

Family
Forbes was twice married. His first wife was Agnes Gairey, whom he married in 1749 and who died the following year. His second wife was Rachel Houston, daughter of Ludovick Houston of Johnstone; she was as enthusiastic a Jacobite as her husband, and frequent mention is made of her in The Lyon in Mourning. The bishop permitted favoured guests to drink out of Prince Charlie's brogues; Rachel sent to the ‘royal exile’ the seed-cake which Oliphant of Gask presented to him.

References

External links
 Scottish History in Print: "The Lyon in Mourning", By Bishop Robert Forbes.

1708 births
1775 deaths
Alumni of the University of Aberdeen
People from Aberdeenshire
18th-century Scottish Episcopalian bishops
Protestant Jacobites
Scottish Jacobites
Jacobite propagandists
Bishops of Moray, Ross and Caithness